This is a list of Canadian films which were released in 1970:

See also
 1970 in Canada
 1970 in Canadian television

References

1970
Canada
1970 in Canada